Louis Adams Jr. (born 22 February 1996) is an American basketball player for Ostioneros de Guaymas of the Mexican Circuito de Baloncesto de la Costa del Pacífico (CIBACOPA).

Adams attended the University of Wyoming after transferring from Odessa College. He had a 31-point performance against New Mexico as a senior after missing two games with an ankle injury. As a senior, he averaged 9.7 points per game while shooting 42% from the three-point line. On August 10, 2018, he signed with Champagne Châlons-Reims of the French side. He played there during the 2018–19 Pro A season. In March 2020, Adams signed with Ostioneros de Guaymas in Mexico.

References

External links
Wyoming Cowboys bio

1996 births
Living people
American expatriate basketball people in France
American expatriate basketball people in Mexico
American men's basketball players
Basketball players from Chicago
Champagne Châlons-Reims Basket players
Odessa Wranglers men's basketball players
Point guards
Shooting guards
Wyoming Cowboys basketball players